Paul Rosenberg is the name of:

Paul Rosenberg (art dealer) (1881–1959), French art dealer
Paul Rosenberg (music manager) (born 1971), manager of Eminem and head of Shady Records
H. Paul Rosenberg (1924–1990), American sports team owner